jvf or JVF or variation, may refer to:

 John V. Fleming (born 1936, "jvf"), U.S. literary critic
 Jaipur Virasat Foundation (JVF), founder and operator of the Jaipur Literature Festival
 Johor Volunteer Forces (JVF), element of the Royal Johor Military Force
 Jabalpur Vehicle Factory

See also

 Jean Vincent Félix Lamouroux (1779–1825; J.V.F. Lamouroux), French biologist